Randy Layne Turnbull (born February 7, 1962) is a Canadian former professional ice hockey defenceman. He played one game in the National Hockey League with the Calgary Flames during the 1981–82 season. The rest of his career, which lasted from 1981 to 1988, was spent in the minor leagues. He was primarily known as a tough guy. In his role as an enforcer, he was a feared role player in the juniors and minor leagues.

Born in Red Deer, Alberta, Turnbull played major junior hockey for the Portland Winter Hawks. He was drafted in the fifth round (97th overall) by the Calgary Flames of the 1980 NHL Entry Draft.

Career statistics

Regular season and playoffs

See also
 List of players who played only one game in the NHL

External links
 

1962 births
Living people
Calgary Flames draft picks
Calgary Flames players
Canadian ice hockey defencemen
Colorado Flames players
Flint Spirits players
Fort Saskatchewan Traders players
Ice hockey people from Alberta
New Haven Nighthawks players
Peoria Prancers players
Portland Winterhawks players
Salt Lake Golden Eagles (IHL) players
Sportspeople from Red Deer, Alberta